The Journal of Forensic Psychiatry & Psychology is a bimonthly peer-reviewed medical journal covering forensic psychiatry and psychology. It was established in 1990 as the Journal of Forensic Psychiatry, obtaining its current name in 2003. The editor-in-chief is Jenny Shaw (University of Manchester). According to the Journal Citation Reports, the journal had a 2018 impact factor of 0.942.

References

External links

Forensic psychology journals
Forensic psychiatry journals
Routledge academic journals
Bimonthly journals
Publications established in 1990
English-language journals